Liu Xun is the name of:

Emperor Xuan of Han (91BC – 49BC), given name Liu Xun, emperor of the Han dynasty
Liu Xun (warlord) ( 197–199), warlord and prefect of Lujiang during the late Han dynasty
Liu Xun (Liu Zhang's son) ( 212–214), son of the warlord Liu Zhang during the late Han dynasty
Liu Xun (Later Liang) (858–921), major general under Zhu Wen during the Tang and Later Liang dynasties